Tyoply Klyuch is a rural locality (a village) in Verkhnekiginsky Selsoviet, Kiginsky District, Bashkortostan, Russia. The population was 71 as of 2010. There is 1 street.

Geography 
Tyoply Klyuch is located 12 km southeast of Verkhniye Kigi (the district's administrative centre) by road. Tuguzly is the nearest rural locality.

References 

Rural localities in Kiginsky District